Lycium ferocissimum, the African boxthorn or boxthorn, is a shrub in the nightshade family (Solanaceae). The species is native to the Western Cape, Eastern Cape, and Free State provinces in South Africa and has become naturalised in Australia and New Zealand. It is listed in Australia's Weed of National Significance list and is a declared noxious weed in the United States.

Description 

The solitary flowers emerge from the leaf axils and are purplish.

The species was first formally described in 1854 by British botanist John Miers in the Annals and Magazine of Natural History. His description was based on plant material collected from Uitenhage in South Africa.

Lycium ferocissimum in Cyprus

References

ferocissimum
Endemic flora of South Africa
Flora of the Cape Provinces
Fynbos
Albany thickets